Tofa is a Local Government Area in Kano State, Nigeria. Its headquarters are in the town of Tofa.

It has an area of 202 km and a population of 97,734 at the 2006 census.

The postal code of the area is 701.

References

Local Government Areas in Kano State